Simon Hirsch Rifkind (June 5, 1901 – November 14, 1995) was a United States district judge of the United States District Court for the Southern District of New York and trial lawyer.

Education and career

Born on June 5, 1901, in Meretz, Russian Empire (now Merkinė, Lithuania), Rifkind emigrated with his family to New York City, New York in 1910. He received a Bachelor of Science degree in 1922 from the City College of New York, graduating Phi Beta Kappa, and a Bachelor of Laws in 1925 from Columbia Law School. He entered private practice in New York City from 1926 to 1930. He was an administrative assistant to United States Senator Robert F. Wagner of New York from 1927 to 1933. He returned to private practice in New York City from 1933 to 1941.

Federal judicial service

Rifkind was nominated by President Franklin D. Roosevelt on April 25, 1941, to a seat on the United States District Court for the Southern District of New York vacated by Judge Robert P. Patterson He was confirmed by the United States Senate on June 3, 1941, and received his commission on June 6, 1941. His service terminated on May 24, 1950, due to his resignation.

Post judicial service

After his resignation from the federal bench, Rifkind returned to private practice in New York City from 1950, with the law firm of Paul, Weiss, Rifkind, Wharton & Garrison, where he continued to serve as a senior partner until his death. He died on November 14, 1995, at Lenox Hill Hospital in Manhattan, New York City. He resided in the Upper East Side of Manhattan at the time of his death.

See also
List of Jewish American jurists

References

Sources

External links 
 Paul, Weiss homepage
 Paul, Weiss firm principles, penned by Simon H. Rifkind
 City College of New York City center named for Rifkind
 A Lawyer's Credo, by Simon H. Rifkind

20th-century American lawyers
City College of New York alumni
Columbia Law School alumni
Emigrants from the Russian Empire to the United States
1901 births
1995 deaths
Lawyers from New York City
Judges of the United States District Court for the Southern District of New York
United States district court judges appointed by Franklin D. Roosevelt
20th-century American judges
Paul, Weiss, Rifkind, Wharton & Garrison people
Charles H. Revson Foundation